Affane Cappoquin GAA is a Gaelic Athletic Association club based in Cappoquin, County Waterford, Ireland.  The club was formed in 1969  with the merging of Affane GAA and Cappoquin GAA.  At present, the team is called Cappoquin when playing hurling and Affane when playing gaelic football.

Its finest hour in football came in 1974 when, having beaten Stradbally in the quarter-final and The Nire in the semi-final, Affane defeated Dunhill by 1-8 to 0-6 to win its only Waterford Senior Football Championship title. Affane went on to represent Waterford in the Munster Senior Club Football Championship, losing to Austin Stacks of Kerry. As Cappoquin, the club has reached one Waterford Senior Hurling Championship final, losing to Mount Sion in 1956. Their most recent success came in 2014 winning the Waterford Intermediate Hurling Championship beating St Saviours 2-19 to 2-11 in the county final. They also won the Munster championship beating Limerick champions Bruff 1-11-0-13.

The club grounds, located on the Dungarvan Road, hosted the 1945 All-Ireland Senior Camogie Championship Final where Antrim beat Waterford.

Honours

 Waterford Senior Football Championship, 1974 / Runners up 1973
 Waterford Intermediate Hurling Championship Winners 1976, 2014 / Runners up 1970, 1995
 West Waterford Intermediate Hurling Championship Winners 1976, 1995, 2014
 Munster Intermediate Club Hurling Championship Winners 2014
 Waterford Intermediate Football Championship Winners (2) 1966, 1992
 Waterford Junior Hurling Championship Winners (2) 1944, 1948  | Runners-Up 1942, 1965
 Waterford Under-21 Hurling Championship Winners 1970, 1980  | Runners-Up 2008, 2011, 2012
 Waterford Under-21 Football Championship  Winners 1972 / Runners-Up 1971, 1973, 1981
 Waterford Minor Hurling Championship Winners 1978   | Runners-Up 1945, 1946, 1947, 1956, 1969, 1977, 2006
 Waterford Minor Football Championship Winners 1934 (as Blackwater Rovers), 1947, 1978 | Runners-Up 1977

References

Gaelic games clubs in County Waterford
Hurling clubs in County Waterford
Gaelic football clubs in County Waterford